Larinopoda eurema, the western pierid blue, is a butterfly in the family Lycaenidae. It is found in Guinea, Sierra Leone, Liberia, Ivory Coast and Ghana. The habitat consists of forests.

References

Butterflies described in 1880
Poritiinae
Butterflies of Africa